This article is a list of the railway stations in Eritrea.
The Eritrean Railway originally ran from Massawa, a port on the Red Sea, via the capital Asmara to Agordat. The line can be divided into three sections (Massawa-Asmara; Asmara-Keren; Keren-Agordat). Additionally there was until WW2 a potash line, that was used also for civilian service.

Massawa to Asmara

The route was built between 1887 and 1910 by the Italians, who made the two main stations (Asmara and Massawa) with typical structures of railway stations in small Italian cities.

As of 2008, this is the only section open.

Asmara to Keren 

This section (with the stations) was built between 1911 and 1923. The railway generally followed the Anseba River and one of its tributaries through the mountains between Zazzega and Halib Mentel.

Keren to Agordat 

This section was built between 1924 and 1929.

Beyond Agordat 

Beyond Agordat, the rails were laid as far as Bishia, another , with plans to extend to Ellit and Teseney, linking with the railway network in Sudan. However this section was never completed.

There would have been a break-of-gauge at the connection between Sudan and Eritrea.

Potash railway 
 
A  line carrying potash was built to serve the following locations:
 
 Badda
 Adaito
 
The  gauge line was active from 1905: a 600-mm track gauge line was built by the Italians inside the port of Mersa Fatuma and from it into the hinterland until Kululi near the Ethiopian border. This was the main source of potash in Eritrea and had to cease operations because of the Great Depression of 1929.

See also 
 Transport in Eritrea
 Eritrean Railway
 Italian Eritrea
 Italian Eritreans
 Railway stations in Sudan
 Railway stations in Ethiopia
 Railway stations in Somalia

References

External links

Railway stations
Railway stations
Eritrea

de:Schienenverkehr in Eritrea
it:Stazioni ferroviarie dell'Eritrea